Liolaemus disjunctus is a species of lizard in the family  Liolaemidae. It is native to Peru.

References

disjunctus
Reptiles described in 1990
Reptiles of Peru
Taxa named by Raymond Laurent